Whitford Garne is a historic home located in West Whiteland Township, Chester County, Pennsylvania. The house was built in 1905, and is a -story, five-bay dwelling with a service wing in the Georgian Revival style. It has a gable roof with dormers and the front facade features a Palladian window.  It is used for a pool and tennis club in a planned residential development.

It was listed on the National Register of Historic Places in 1984.

References

Houses on the National Register of Historic Places in Pennsylvania
Georgian Revival architecture in Pennsylvania
Houses completed in 1905
Houses in Chester County, Pennsylvania
National Register of Historic Places in Chester County, Pennsylvania
1905 establishments in Pennsylvania